Rice Owen Clark (1816 – 16 June 1896) was an English settler in New Zealand, establishing a brickworks at Hobsonville that was the origin of Crown Lynn and Ceramco.

Biography
Clark was baptised in Great Marlow, Buckinghamshire, England, on 19 September 1816, the son of Josiah and Ann Clark and the brother of engineers Edwin Clark and Josiah Latimer Clark. He emigrated to New Zealand on the Gertrude, arriving at Port Nicholson on 31 October 1841. He ran a church school in Wellington, but it was destroyed by earthquake and he subsequently moved to Auckland.

In 1854 Clark bought land in Hobsonville, becoming one of the first European settlers in the area. It was there that he set up a prosperous business making drain pipes, bricks and tiles for the increasing number of settlers. Much of the clay he used was being sourced from Limeburners Bay, which is now an archaeological site.

When he was 33 years old, Clark was accused of bigamy at the Wellington Supreme Court, but he was found not guilty.

Clark died at his home in Hobsonville on 16 June 1896, and was buried at Hobsonville Cemetery.

Legacy
In 1908 Clark's Potteries became R.O. Clark Limited. His great-grandson, Tom Clark, inherited the business setting up a ceramics company which eventually became known as Crown Lynn Potteries Ltd.

Notes

References
 Clough, R. 2006. Hobsonville Limeburners Bay, Proposed Subdivision Dp104222: Archaeological Assessment. Unpublished Report.

1816 births
1896 deaths
People from Great Marlow
English emigrants to New Zealand
Settlers of New Zealand
New Zealand businesspeople